M. M. Srilekha (born Koduri Srilekha) is an Indian film playback singer and music composer, known for her works predominantly in Telugu cinema. She is the only female music composer in the Telugu film industry. Her paternal uncle V. Vijayendra Prasad's directorial venture Srivalli (2017) was her 75th film.

Personal life and career
Srilekha is the cousin of music composer M. M. Keeravani and popular director S.S. Rajamouli. She was married to Putta Prasad in the year 2003.

She started her career as a playback singer at the age of nine and was assisting her brother in music direction. She turned into a music composer at the age of 12 with the film Nalaiya Theerpu (1992) which was also the debut film for noted Tamil movie star Vijay. She later composed for the movies Taj Mahal (1995) and Dasari Narayana Rao's Nannagaru.

She composed music for many movies
in Telugu, Tamil, Kannada, and Malayalam languages. Apart from South Indian films, She has composed for Hindi films like Hum Aapke Dil Mein Rehte Hain (1999), Mere Sapnon Ki Raani, Aaghaaz (2000) etc.

Discography

As playback singer

Filmography as composer

References

External links 
 

Living people
Indian women playback singers
Telugu film score composers
Telugu playback singers
Filmfare Awards South winners
1982 births
Singers from Andhra Pradesh
Film musicians from Andhra Pradesh
20th-century Indian composers
21st-century Indian composers
Indian women composers
20th-century Indian women artists
21st-century Indian women singers
Women musicians from Andhra Pradesh
21st-century Indian singers
21st-century Indian women musicians
20th-century Indian women singers
20th-century Indian singers
20th-century women composers
21st-century women composers
Women film score composers